Patoka Township is one of twelve townships in Dubois County, Indiana. As of the 2010 census its population was 7,527 and it contained 3,056 housing units.

Geography
Knebel Lake is in this township.

Cities and towns
 Huntingburg

Unincorporated towns
 Duff

Adjacent townships
 Bainbridge Township (northeast)
 Jackson Township (east)
 Ferdinand Township (southeast)
 Cass Township (south)
 Lockhart Township, Pike County (west)
 Madison Township (northwest)
 Marion Township, Pike County (northwest)

Major highways
  U.S. Route 231
  Indiana State Road 64
  Indiana State Road 161

Cemeteries
The township contains three cemeteries: Central, Fairmount and Mayo.

References
 United States Census Bureau cartographic boundary files
 U.S. Board on Geographic Names

External links
 Indiana Township Association
 United Township Association of Indiana

Townships in Dubois County, Indiana
Jasper, Indiana micropolitan area
Townships in Indiana